Sukrathindra Thirta (26 March 1897 – 10 July 1949), also referred to as Shri Sukrathindra Thirtha Swamiji, was the legal and spiritual head (mathadipathi) of the Kashi Math and the nineteenth successive person called the swamiji of guru parampara.

Kashi Math
Sukrathindra Thirtha took the charge of Kashi Math in 1914 after the samadhi of his guru, Varadendra Thirtha, in Walkeshwar, Mumbai. As per the tradition of the math, to continue the guruparampara, on 24 May 1944, he initiated a vatu into sanyasa to be the 20th, and called him Sudhindra Thirtha.

Vrindavan Sweekar
Sukrathindra Thirtha attained  Vrindavan 10 July 1949 at Cochin Thirumala Devaswom Temple, Kochi.

References

External links
  Dahisar Sri Kashi Math

1897 births
1949 deaths
Indian Hindus
People from Kerala